Lifestyles of the Broke and Obscure is a compilation album by the band Wolfsbane consisting of the albums Wolfsbane (CD1) and Massive Noise Injection (CD2).

Track listing 
Disc One: Wolfsbane
 "Wings" - 4.21
 "Lifestyles of the Broke and Obscure" - 3.47
 "My Face" - 3.26
 "Money Talks" - 4.25
 "Seen How It's Done" - 4.36
 "Beautiful Lies" - 3.36
 "Protect and Survive" - 3.24
 "Black Machine" - 3.13
 "Violence" - 3.41
 "Die Again" - 13.23 (includes "hidden" track "Say Goodbye")

Disc Two: Massive Noise Injection
 "Protect and Survive" - 3:47
 "Load Me Down" - 3:02
 "Black Lagoon" - 4:54
 "Rope and Ride" - 4:08
 "Kathy Wilson" - 4:21
 "Loco" - 3:33
 "End of the Century" - 4:10
 "Steel" - 4:56
 "Temple of Rock" - 5:37
 "Manhunt" - 3:56
 "Money to Burn" - 6:56
 "Paint the Town Red" - 3:48
 "Wild Thing" - 5:31

Personnel
Blaze Bayley: Vocals
Jason Edwards: Guitar
Jeff Hately: Bass
Steve "Danger" Ellet: Drums

References

Wolfsbane (band) albums
2001 compilation albums
Sanctuary Records compilation albums